Saleem is a Palestinian-American playwright, actor and dancer based in Los Angeles, California, United States. He was the recipient of a 1996 GLAAD Harvey Fierstein Award for Best Original Writing for his semi-autobiographical play Salam Shalom: A Tale Of Passion.

As a dancer, Saleem developed his own style which incorporates belly dancing, gypsy movements, flamenco and jazz to produce what he calls "free style belly dancing".

External links
  Palestinian-Born Playwright Offers Insight and Hope for the Peace in the Middle East (September 9, 2003) - Article on Saleem by Michael Austin.

Palestinian male actors
Palestinian dramatists and playwrights
20th-century American dramatists and playwrights
Living people
Palestinian male stage actors
American writers of Palestinian descent
Place of birth missing (living people)
Year of birth missing (living people)